Michel Rabreau (6 September 1937 – 15 March 2021) was a French politician.

Biography
Rabreau was a pharmacist and biologist by profession. After his studies, he took over his father's pharmacy in Guérande and also managed an analytical laboratory.

Rabreau's father, a former member of the French Resistance, inspired him to become a Gaullist activist. He became the deputy to Pierre Litoux, a member of the National Assembly from 1962 to 1968. In 1967, Litoux was defeated by Olivier Guichard. Guichard declined to stand in 1968 to serve a ministerial position, and was replaced by Rabreau. A , he supported Jacques Chaban-Delmas in the 1974 French presidential election. He also served as Mayor of Guérande from 1986 to 1993.

Michel Rabreau died on 15 March 2021 at the age of 83.

References

1937 births
2021 deaths
Mayors of places in Pays de la Loire
10
People from Loire-Atlantique
Deputies of the 4th National Assembly of the French Fifth Republic
French pharmacists
20th-century French biologists